Alcibiades (1927–1957) was an American Thoroughbred racemare that won the Kentucky Oaks and was later a good broodmare.

Background
Owned and bred by Hal Price Headley at his Beaumont Farm near Lexington, Kentucky, Alcibiades was named for the ancient Greek soldier and statesman Alcibiades. She was sired by Supremus out of Regal Roman. On her sire's side, she goes back to the great stallion Domino.

Racing career
Alcibiades had seven starts with four wins at two-years.  She won the Clipsetta Stakes and Debutante Stakes; ran second in the Kentucky Jockey Club Stakes, and was retrospectively named U.S. Champion two-year-old filly of 1929.

At the age of three years, she had 16 starts, for three wins.  Alcibiades won the Grade I Kentucky Oaks, the Arlington Oaks and finished third in the Hawthorne Gold Cup, the Illinois and Latonia Oaks, and the Arlington Matron Handicap.  She tore a tendon badly in the Latonia Championship, and this was the end of her racing career.  She was retrospectively named Co-Champion three-year-old filly of 1930.

Alcibiades was retired from racing for a record of 23 starts with 7 wins, 2 seconds and 4 thirds with earnings of $47,860.

Breeding record
As a broodmare, Alcibiades produced eight foals, seven of which were runners including: 
Lithe, a sister to Menow, won the Arlington Matron Stakes, the Demoiselle Stakes and Comely Stakes, etc.
Menow was the American Champion Two-Year-Old Colt of 1937 and himself was an influential sire.
Salaminia, winner of 5 races, including the Alabama Stakes; third dam of Epsom Derby winner Sir Ivor
Sparta, had 12 wins and 13 seconds. Female-line ancestor of Cloud Computing.

Pedigree

References

1927 racehorse births
1957 racehorse deaths
Racehorses bred in Kentucky
Racehorses trained in the United States
American Champion racehorses
Kentucky Oaks winners
Thoroughbred family 8-g